Jonielle Antonique Smith (born 30 January 1996) is a Jamaican sprinter who specializes in the 100 metres.

Career
She won gold with team Jamaica in the women's 4 × 100 metres relay at the 2019 World Championships, and was also a 100 metres finalist.

She attended and graduated from Auburn University, competing for the Auburn Tigers from 2015 to 2018. She now trains at MVP International in Florida, an extension of the Jamaica-based MVP Track Club. She is coached by Henry Rolle who originally recruited her to Auburn.

International competitions

Personal bests
Outdoor
100 metres – 11.04 (+0.6 m/s, Kingston, Jamaica 2019)
200 metres – 23.22 (+1.9 m/s, Auburn, Alabama 2017)
Indoor
60 metres – 7.15 (College Station, Texas 2018)

References

External links

1996 births
Living people
Jamaican female sprinters
Competitors at the 2018 Central American and Caribbean Games
Central American and Caribbean Games gold medalists for Jamaica
World Athletics Championships athletes for Jamaica
World Athletics Championships medalists
World Athletics Championships winners
Sportspeople from Kingston, Jamaica
Auburn University alumni
Central American and Caribbean Games medalists in athletics
Auburn Tigers women's track and field athletes
21st-century Jamaican women